The Dahuaqiao Dam is a gravity dam on the Lancang (upper Mekong) River in Lanping Bai and Pumi Autonomous County of Yunnan Province, China. The primary purpose of the dam is hydroelectric power generation. Construction began in 2010 and its 900 MW hydroelectric power station was fully operational as of 2019.

See also

Hydropower in the Mekong River Basin
List of tallest dams in the world
List of dams and reservoirs in China
List of tallest dams in China

References

Dams in China
Dams in the Mekong River Basin
Gravity dams
Hydroelectric power stations in Yunnan
Nujiang Lisu Autonomous Prefecture
Roller-compacted concrete dams
Buildings and structures in Nujiang Lisu Autonomous Prefecture